The Fungor language, Ko (Kau) or Nyaro, is a Niger–Congo language of the Heiban family spoken in Kordofan, Sudan.

References

Heiban languages